WFHG-FM is a talk formatted broadcast radio station licensed to Bluff City, Tennessee and serving the Tri-Cities region of Tennessee and Virginia.  WFHG is owned and operated by Bristol Broadcasting Company, Inc.

External links
 Super Talk 92.9 WFHG Online
 

FHG-FM
Radio stations established in 1966
1966 establishments in Tennessee